Gerald Courtenay Phillips (3 November 1886 — 26 January 1938) was a Welsh first-class cricketer and British Indian Army officer.

The son of P. S. Phillips, he was born in November 1886 at Crumlin, Monmouthshire. He was educated at Marlborough College, where he played for the college cricket team. Going to British India, Phillips served in the British Indian Army Reserve during the First World War, being commissioned as a second lieutenant in June 1915, with him holding the rank of captain in April 1918. During the war, he served on the Western Front and in Palestine with the Poona Horse. While in India, he played first-class cricket as a batsman for the Europeans cricket team, making nine appearances in the Bombay Quadrangular Matches from 1910 to 1926. He also made one non-Quadrangular appearance for the Europeans, in addition to playing for a combined Europeans and Parsees team against the touring Marylebone Cricket Club in 1926. Phillips scored 551 runs in his eleven first-class matches at an average of 30.61, with six half centuries and a highest score of 94. He also bowled on occasion, taking 4 wickets. Outside of cricket, he was in business in Bombay. Phillips retired to England, where he was resident at Kingsland. In his latter years, he was cared for in a residential care home in London, where he died in January 1938. His brothers, Frank and Noel, both played first-class cricket.

References

External links

1886 births
1938 deaths
People educated at Marlborough College
Welsh cricketers
Europeans cricketers
British Indian Army officers
Indian Army personnel of World War I
Europeans and Parsees cricketers